Articles on Fluidized bed include:

 Fluidized bed
 Fluidized bed combustion
 Fluidized bed dryer
 Fluidized bed reactor
 Coffee roasting using a fluidized bed